Rushville is a village in Ontario and Yates Counties in the U.S. state of New York. The population was 655 in the 2019 American Community Survey. Most of the Village of Rushville is within the Town of Potter in Yates County and a small part is in the Town of Gorham in Ontario County. It is one of two villages in Ontario County that is split between two townships and the only village in Ontario split between two counties.

History 
Rushville was originally called Federal Hollow. The town was called this because many its initial settlers favored the Federalist political party, and it is located in one Canandaigua Lake's many hollows, or valleys. Elias Gilbert was the first settler in Rushville, also opening one of the first saw mills on the West River in 1800.

Federal Hollow became Rushvile in 1819, when it got a Post Station. Town leadership chose the name in honor of Dr. Benjamin Rush, a hero of the American Revolution, at the suggestion of local doctor Ira Bryant. The first postmaster was Chester Loomis.

The Milton Wilson House was listed on the National Register of Historic Places in 1994.

In 2017, the village voted no to dissolution, 179 “no” to 96 “yes.”

Notable person
 Marcus Whitman, missionary who led the first wagon train on the Oregon Trail.

Geography
Rushville is located at  (42.761136, -77.226177).

According to the United States Census Bureau, the village has a total area of 0.6 square miles (1.7 km2), all land.

Rushville is in the Finger Lakes District of New York and lies between Canandaigua Lake and Seneca Lake.  The West River flows southwest through the village.

Marcus Whitman Middle/High School is located just outside Rushville.

New York State Route 245 and New York State Route 247, pass, partly conjoined, through the Village of Rushville.

Demographics

According to 2019 American Community Survey,  there were 655 people, 237 households, and 155 families residing in the village. The population density was 1026 people per square mile. There were 313 housing units. The racial makeup of the village was 96.8% White, 1.1% African American, 0% Native American,  0% Asian, and 0.3% two or more races. Hispanic or Latino of any race were 1.8% of the population.

There were 237 households, out of which 30.4% had children under the age of 18 living with them. 60.3% were married couples living together, 15.3% had a female householder with no husband present, and 19.9% were non-families. 24.1% of all households were made up of individuals, and 48.5% of households had one or more people 60 years of age and over. The average household size was 2.7.

In the village, the population was spread out, with 22% under the age of 18, 12% from 20 to 29, 14% from 30 to 39, 10% from 40 to 49, 13% from 50 to 59, and 16% from 60 to 69. Overall, 17% of Rushville's population is 65 and older. The average age of a Rushville citizen is 39.7 years old.

The per capita income for a household in the village was $27,359, and the median income for a family was $43,047. Males had a median income of $30,833 versus $27,961 for females. About 6.1% of families and 10.1% of the population were below the poverty line. 33.4% of the village has a high school education, with another 34.8marcu % completing some college. 9.4% have completed a bachelor's degree.

References

External links
 Village of Rushville, NY

1866 establishments in New York (state)
Populated places established in 1866
Villages in Ontario County, New York
Villages in Yates County, New York
Villages in New York (state)